David "Dave" Barends (birth unknown) is a South African professional rugby league footballer who played in the 1970s and 1980s.

Background
As of 2015, Dave Barends lives in South Elmsall.

Playing career

International honours
Barends won two caps for Great Britain while at Bradford Northern in 1979, both against Australia, and is the only South African-born player to have represented Great Britain. He also represented the Other Nationalities team while at Bradford Northern and York.

Premiership Final appearances
Dave Barends played in Bradford Northern’s 17–8 victory over Widnes in the Premiership Final during the 1977–78 season at Station Road, Swinton on Saturday 20 May 1978.

County Cup Final appearances
Dave Barends played , i.e. number 2, in Bradford Northern's 18–8 victory over York in the 1978–79 Yorkshire County Cup Final during the 1978–79 season at Headingley Rugby Stadium, Leeds on Saturday 28 October 1978, played , in the 5–10 defeat by Castleford in the 1981–82 Yorkshire County Cup Final during the 1981–82 season at Headingley Rugby Stadium, Leeds on Saturday 3 October 1981, and played , in the 7–18 defeat by Hull F.C. in the 1982–83 Yorkshire County Cup Final during the 1981–82 season at Elland Road, Leeds on Saturday 2 October 1982.

John Player Trophy Final appearances
Dave Barends played , i.e. number 2, in Bradford Northern's 6–0 victory over Widnes in the 1979–80 John Player Trophy Final during the 1979–80 season at Headingley Rugby Stadium, Leeds on Saturday 5 January 1980.

Club career
Dave Barends was recommended to Wakefield Trinity by the former Wakefield Trinity player from South Africa, Ivor Dorrington, and joined in 1970 for a signing-on fee of £1,000 (based on increases in average earnings, this would be approximately £24,2800 in 2016), he scored 2-tries on his début against Blackpool Borough at Belle Vue, Wakefield.

References

External links
!Great Britain Statistics at englandrl.co.uk (statistics currently missing due to not having appeared for both Great Britain, and England)
The (South African) Rhinos Move To Hull
South African and Great Britain Lion Dave Barends Guest of Yorkshire
Photograph "David Barends dives in" at rlhp.co.uk
Photograph "Dave Barends dives" at rlhp.co.uk
Photograph "David Barends hands off" at rlhp.co.uk
Photograph "Team photo 1978" at rlhp.co.uk
Photograph "Northern celebrate the Championship win" at rlhp.co.uk
Photograph "1981 team v. Hull" at rlhp.co.uk
Photograph "The 1981 squad pictured at Odsal" at rlhp.co.uk
Photograph "Dave Barends About To Touch Down" at rlhp.co.uk
Photograph "Reverse pass from Greenwood" at rlhp.co.uk
Photograph "Northern's victorious players celebrate" at rlhp.co.uk
Photograph "Delighted Northern players with the cup" at rlhp.co.uk
Photograph "Barends Leaps For Glory" at rlhp.co.uk

1949 births
Living people
Bradford Bulls players
Featherstone Rovers players
Great Britain national rugby league team players
Other Nationalities rugby league team players
Place of birth missing (living people)
Rugby league players from the Western Cape
Rugby league wingers
South African rugby league players
Wakefield Trinity players
York Wasps players